Nicolas Emilio "Nick" Gindre (born 24 July 1984) is an Argentine footballer who last played as a goalkeeper for Mpumalanga Black Aces in South Africa.

Career
Born in Buenos Aires, Gindre moved to England at the age of 10 and began football career with Walton Casuals at 14. He played for Walton Casuals for three years and moved to neighbouring club Walton & Hersham in 2003. He made his debut for Walton & Hersham in January as a 17-year-old. He had a trial with Millwall in August 2005. Gindre signed for Conference National team Woking in January 2007. He played 40 times for Woking before he went on loan to Croydon Athletic in November 2008. After returning from Croydon, he left Woking by mutual consent in January 2009 and he signed for AFC Wimbledon in February. He was contracted by AFC Wimbledon as keeper for the injured Andy Little and signed on 19 May 2009 for AmaZulu. He helped the club reach the final of the 2010 Nedbank Cup, saving three times in the semi-final penalty shootout.

References

External links

1984 births
Living people
Footballers from Buenos Aires
Argentine footballers
Argentine expatriate footballers
Argentine expatriate sportspeople in South Africa
Argentine expatriate sportspeople in England
Expatriate footballers in England
Expatriate soccer players in South Africa
Association football goalkeepers
Walton Casuals F.C. players
Walton & Hersham F.C. players
Woking F.C. players
Croydon Athletic F.C. players
AFC Wimbledon players
AmaZulu F.C. players
National League (English football) players